Callopizoma is a genus of moths in the family Lasiocampidae. The genus was erected by Yves de Lajonquière in 1972. It is known to be found in Madagascar.

Species
Some species of this genus are:
Callopizoma malgassica (Kenrick, 1914)
Callopizoma micans De Lajonquière, 1972

References

Lasiocampidae